Manuel Pavón Castro (born 27 February 1984) is a Spanish professional footballer who plays for CD Don Benito as a central defender.

Over eight seasons, he totalled 217 matches in Segunda División for Numancia, Lugo and Ponferradina (two goals scored). In La Liga, he also appeared for the first club.

Club career
Pavón was born in Santa Fe, Granada. After passing through a host of academies, he finally finished his development at CD Numancia. In early 2007 he had an unassuming Segunda División B loan spell at his second youth club, Granada CF, returning to the Nuevo Estadio Los Pajaritos in the 2007–08 season.

Pavón made his La Liga debut on 26 October 2008, playing the entire 2–1 home win against Racing de Santander. At the end of the campaign, however, the Soria side returned to the Segunda División after only one year up.

Pavón continued competing in the second tier the following years, representing CD Lugo and SD Ponferradina. He scored his first goal as a professional on 27 September 2014 whilst at the service of the former team, contributing to a 4–3 home victory over CA Osasuna.

References

External links

1984 births
Living people
Sportspeople from the Province of Granada
Spanish footballers
Footballers from Andalusia
Association football defenders
La Liga players
Segunda División players
Segunda División B players
Tercera División players
CD Numancia B players
CD Numancia players
Granada CF footballers
CD Lugo players
SD Ponferradina players
CF Fuenlabrada footballers
Marbella FC players
Orihuela CF players